Caroline Davis, née Caroline Rebecca Anson, (born July 7, 1981) is a saxophonist, flutist, composer, and educator.

Background 
Davis was born in Singapore, Singapore, to Michael Anson (British) and actress Susanne Anson (Swedish). When she was 6 years old, her family moved to Atlanta, Georgia, and she began playing saxophone at Sequoyah Middle School. Soon after, her parents divorced and she moved with her mother to Carrollton, Texas, where she attended Blalack Middle School and Newman Smith High School. After high school, she went to The University of Texas at Arlington, where she majored in Cognitive Psychology and Music (2004). During this time, she was also introduced to the education program at Litchfield Jazz Camp, in Connecticut. Her love for jazz blossomed here, while at the same time, she continued her academic path at Northwestern University and received a Ph.D in Music Cognition in 2010. After her studies, she taught adjunct at Northwestern University, DePaul University, and Columbia College.

Career in music 
Davis kept her involvement with the music industry throughout her years in academia, including her participation in IAJE's Sisters in Jazz Program (2006) and Betty Carter's Jazz Ahead Program (2011). In 2013, Davis moved to New York to more rigorously pursue her path as a professional musician.

In 2018, she was at the top of DownBeat Magazine's Critic's Poll Alto-Saxophone Rising Star list.

In 2019, Davis was a composer-in-residence at the MacDowell Colony.

Discography

As a leader 
 Anthems (Sunnyside, 2019)
 Alula (New Amsterdam, 2019)
 Heart Tonic (Sunnyside, 2018)
 Doors: Chicago Storylines (Ears & Eyes, 2015)
 Live Work & Play (Ears & Eyes, 2012)

As a sidewoman 
 Curt Sydnor: Deep End Shallow (Out of Your Head Records, 2020)
 Wolff Parkinson White: Favours (self, 2020)
 Lee Konitz Nonet: Old Songs New (Sunnyside, 2019)
 Neak: Kwesbaar (self, 2019)
 Paul Bedal: Mirrors (Bace, 2018)
 Whirlpool with Ron Miles: Dancing on the Inside (Ears & Eyes, 2015)
 B Forrest: Back to Bodhi (self, 2015)
 Dion Kerr: Reptile Ground (self, 2015)
 Paul Bedal: Chatter (Ears & Eyes, 2014)
 Whirlpool: This World and One More (Ears & Eyes, 2014)
 Pedway: Passion Ball (Ears & Eyes, 2013)
 Saba: Comfort Zone (Saba Pivot, LLC, 2014)
 Neak: Love Greater (self, 2012)
 Pedway: Subventure (Ears & Eyes, 2008)
 Zing!: Magnetic Flux (Ears & Eyes, 2007)
 James Davis Quintet: Angles of Refraction (Ears & Eyes, 2007)

References 

1981 births
Living people